Karlo Igor Majić (born 3 March 1998) is a Croatian footballer who plays as a centre-forward for NK Rudes.

Club career
Majić made his professional debut for Krško in the Slovenian PrvaLiga on 24 February 2019, coming on as a substitute in the 73rd minute for Sandi Ogrinec in the home match against Olimpija Ljubljana, which finished as a 1–4 loss.

References

External links
 
 
 
 Karlo Majić at kicker.de
 
 

1998 births
Living people
Footballers from Zagreb
Association football forwards
Croatian footballers
Croatia youth international footballers
GNK Dinamo Zagreb II players
Fortuna Düsseldorf II players
NK Krško players
NK Sesvete players
NK Rudeš players
NK Croatia Zmijavci players
First Football League (Croatia) players
Regionalliga players
Slovenian PrvaLiga players
Croatian expatriate footballers
Croatian expatriate sportspeople in Germany
Expatriate footballers in Germany
Croatian expatriate sportspeople in Slovenia
Expatriate footballers in Slovenia